Zach Sill (born May 24, 1988) is a Canadian professional ice hockey centreman who is currently playing for Kölner Haie of the Deutsche Eishockey Liga (DEL). In North America, he most recently played for the Hershey Bears in the American Hockey League (AHL) while under contract to the Washington Capitals of the National Hockey League (NHL).

Playing career

Collegiate/junior
Sill was drafted by the Quebec Major Junior Hockey League (QMJHL)'s Moncton Wildcats in the 2005 junior draft, but opted to keep his NCAA eligibility and not immediately play major junior hockey for Moncton. He had an impressive 2005–06 season with the Truro Bearcats of the MJAHL. He began the 2006–07 season with the University of Maine, but parted ways early in 2007 after playing in just six games with the Black Bears. Sill then went back to the Bearcats for six games before going on to win playoff MVP and lead the Bearcats to the Fred Page Cup championship.

The following season, Sill started began his major junior career with the Moncton Wildcats, scoring 27 goals and 23 assists over two seasons. He was named Best Defensive Forward, among other honours, in the 2008–09 season before beginning his professional career in the Pittsburgh Penguins organization.

Professional
On May 16, 2011, the Pittsburgh Penguins announced that they had signed Sill to a two-year contract.

Sill made his NHL debut on November 16, 2013, skating 9:10 of ice time with the Penguins in a 4–1 loss to the New Jersey Devils at the Prudential Center.

In the following season, 2014–15, Sill, after 47 career NHL games without recording a point, produced his first point, an assist, on a Marcel Goc goal on January 13, 2015, against the Minnesota Wild. On January 21, in Sill's 52nd career NHL game, he scored his first NHL goal against Corey Crawford of the Chicago Blackhawks.

On February 25, 2015, Sill was traded to the Toronto Maple Leafs, along with Pittsburgh's fourth-round draft pick in 2015 and their second-round pick in 2016, in exchange for forward Daniel Winnik. Sill finished the regular season with Toronto, playing in 21 games and registering one assist.

Sill was not resigned by the Leafs and on July 15, 2015, signed a one-year, two-way contract with the Washington Capitals. He was subsequently resigned to a two-year, two way deal on June 30, 2016. In a game against the Boston Bruins on January 5, 2016, Sill boarded Bruins defenceman Adam McQuaid and was suspended two games.

After completing his third season within the Washington Capitals organization playing with AHL affiliate, the Hershey Bears, Sill left North America as a free agent after nine professional season, and on August 13, 2018, agreed to a one-year contract with Sparta Praha of the Czech Extraliga (ELH). In his lone season with Sparta Praha, Sill contributed with 11 points in 48 games in a bottom six forward role. On June 27, 2019, Sill left Prague as a free agent.

Continuing his career in Europe, Sill agreed to a one-year contract with German outfit, Kölner Haie of the DEL, on July 8, 2019.

Career statistics

Awards and honors

References

External links
 

1988 births
Living people
Canadian ice hockey centres
Hershey Bears players
Ice hockey people from Nova Scotia
Kölner Haie players
Maine Black Bears men's ice hockey players
Moncton Wildcats players
People from Truro, Nova Scotia
Pittsburgh Penguins players
HC Sparta Praha players
Toronto Maple Leafs players
Undrafted National Hockey League players
Washington Capitals players
Wheeling Nailers players
Wilkes-Barre/Scranton Penguins players